The 2024 West Virginia Republican presidential primary will be held on May 7, 2024, as part of the Republican Party primaries for the 2024 presidential election. 31 delegates to the 2024 Republican National Convention will be allocated on a winner-take-all basis. The contest will be held alongside the Indiana primary.

Candidates 
Former president Donald Trump and former South Carolina governor and U.S. Ambassador to the United Nations Nikki Haley are the only main contenders to officially announce their candidacy so far, although Florida governor Ron DeSantis is widely expected to announce his candidacy as soon as May 2023.

Endorsements

See also 
 2024 Republican Party presidential primaries
 2024 United States presidential election
 2024 United States presidential election in West Virginia
 2024 United States elections

References 

West Virginia Republican primaries
Republican presidential primary
West Virginia